Judith "Jutta" Weber (later Meeuw, born 28 June 1954) is a German former swimmer who competed in the 1972 and 1976 Summer Olympics, and won bronze medals in the 4 × 100 m freestyle and 4 × 100 m medley relay events in 1972. She repeated this achievement next year at the 1973 World Aquatics Championships. In 1974, she won a European silver medal in the 4 × 100 m medley.

Individually, she became national champion in the 100 m (1972, 1973, 1975–1977) and 200 m freestyle (1972, 1973, 1975, 1976). The FRG 1976 Olympic team for the 200 m freestyle included Regina Nissen, Marion Platten and Weber.

Her husband, Folkert Meeuw, competed for West Germany in swimming at the 1968 and 1972 Olympics and won a silver medal in 1972. Her son, Helge Meeuw, also competed in swimming, for unified Germany, in the 2004, 2008 and 2012 Olympics, and won a silver medal in 2012.

References

1954 births
Living people
German female swimmers
German female freestyle swimmers
Olympic swimmers of West Germany
Swimmers at the 1972 Summer Olympics
Swimmers at the 1976 Summer Olympics
Olympic bronze medalists for West Germany
Olympic bronze medalists in swimming
World Aquatics Championships medalists in swimming
European Aquatics Championships medalists in swimming
Sportspeople from Hamm
Medalists at the 1972 Summer Olympics
Universiade medalists in swimming
Universiade gold medalists for West Germany
Universiade silver medalists for West Germany
Medalists at the 1973 Summer Universiade
Medalists at the 1977 Summer Universiade
20th-century German women
21st-century German women